Corma is a genus of moths of the Zygaenidae family.

Species
 Corma fragilis (Walker, 1862)

References
 Corma at Markku Savela's Lepidoptera and Some Other Life Forms

Chalcosiinae
Zygaenidae genera